Priscila Jeanmillette Ortiz Arana (born 7 June 1996) is a Salvadoran footballer who plays as a defender for Alianza FC and the El Salvador women's national team.

Club career
Ortiz has played for Alianza FC in El Salvador.

International career
Ortiz capped for El Salvador at senior level during the 2020 CONCACAF Women's Olympic Qualifying Championship qualification.

See also
List of El Salvador women's international footballers

References

1996 births
Living people
Salvadoran women's footballers
Women's association football defenders
El Salvador women's international footballers